William McNeil Jones (February 3, 1914 – April 9, 2006) was an American professional basketball player. He played in all five games for the National Basketball League's Toledo Jim White Chevrolets before the team disbanded early into the 1942–43 season. Jones was one of the earliest African-American players in the NBL and is considered a pioneer of integration in professional basketball.

He played collegiately at the University of Toledo, followed by stints with barnstorming teams as well as the Harlem Globetrotters. He eventually moved to Los Angeles, California.

References

External links
University of Toledo Hall of Fame profile

1914 births
2006 deaths
American men's basketball players
Basketball players from Ohio
Guards (basketball)
Harlem Globetrotters players

Basketball players from Los Angeles

Sportspeople from Toledo, Ohio
Toledo Jim White Chevrolets players
Toledo Rockets men's basketball players